is a Japanese boxer. He competed in the men's flyweight event at the 1964 Summer Olympics. At the 1964 Summer Olympics, he lost to Otto Babiasch from the United Team of Germany by decision in the Round of 16 after receiving a bye in the Round of 32.

References

External links
 

1943 births
Living people
People from Akita (city)
People from Akita Prefecture
Sportspeople from Akita Prefecture
Japanese male boxers
Olympic boxers of Japan
Boxers at the 1964 Summer Olympics
Place of birth missing (living people)
Flyweight boxers